The 1979–80 Boise State Broncos men's basketball team represented Boise State University during the 1979–80 NCAA Division I men's basketball season. The Broncos were led by seventh-year head coach Bus Connor and played their home games on campus at Bronco Gymnasium in Boise, Idaho.

Connor announced his resignation, effective at the end of the season, with five games remaining. The Broncos lost four straight, then defeated Nevada in the finale on February 23   Dave Leach, an assistant at Oregon State under Ralph Miller, became head coach in 

No Broncos were named to the all-conference team; center Dave Richardson and guard Dave Williams were honorable mention.

References

External links
Sports Reference – Boise State Broncos – 1979–80 basketball season

Boise State Broncos men's basketball seasons
Boise State
Boise State